Aaron Scott is a composer and jazz drummer, born June 19, 1956, in Chicago, Illinois.

He lived in Paris a number of years. While in Paris, he performed with Orchestre National de Jazz and studied conducting at the École Normale de Musique de Paris. He was later awarded Chevalier dans l'Ordre des Arts et des Lettres by then Minister of Culture, Jack Lang. In 1989 he began a 14-year association and tenure with master jazz pianist McCoy Tyner as part of the McCoy Tyner Trio, winning three Grammy Awards and performing worldwide.

Discography

As sideman
With McCoy Tyner
 Live at Sweet Basil (Evidence, 1989)
 44th Street Suite (Red Baron, 1991)
 Blue Bossa (Lester Recording, 1991)
 Remembering John (Enja, 1991)
 Infinity (Impulse!, 1995)

With others
 Bob Stewart, Then & Now (Postcards, 1996)
 Circles, (Summit, 2005)
 Billy Harper, Blueprints of Jazz Vol. 2 (Talking House Records, 2008)

References

External links 
 Official site archived 2009-10-24

1956 births
20th-century American drummers
American male drummers
African-American drummers
American jazz drummers
Berklee College of Music alumni
Chevaliers of the Ordre des Arts et des Lettres
École Normale de Musique de Paris alumni
Living people
Musicians from Chicago
Post-bop jazz musicians
Jazz musicians from Illinois
20th-century American male musicians
American male jazz musicians
Orchestre National de Jazz members
21st-century American drummers
21st-century American male musicians
20th-century African-American musicians
21st-century African-American musicians